Ronald Gene Simmons Sr. (July 15, 1940 – June 25, 1990) was an American mass murderer and spree killer who killed 16 people over a week-long period in Arkansas in 1987. A retired military serviceman, Simmons murdered fourteen members of his family, including a daughter he had sexually abused and the child he had fathered with her, as well as a former co-worker, and a stranger; he also wounded four others. He is the most prolific mass murderer in Arkansas history.

Simmons was sentenced to death on each of sixteen counts, and after refusing to appeal his sentence, was executed on June 25, 1990. His refusal to appeal was the subject of a 1990 US Supreme Court case, Whitmore v. Arkansas.

Early life and military career
Ronald Gene Simmons was born on July 15, 1940, in Chicago, Illinois, to Loretta and William Simmons. On January 31, 1943, William Simmons died of a stroke and within a year, Simmons's mother had remarried, this time to William D. Griffen, a civil engineer for the U.S. Army Corps of Engineers. In 1946, the corps moved Griffen to Little Rock, Arkansas, the first of several transfers that would take the family across central Arkansas over the next decade.

On September 15, 1957, Simmons dropped out of school and joined the U.S. Navy, and was first stationed at Naval Station Bremerton in Washington, where he met Bersabe Rebecca "Becky" Ulibarri, whom he married in New Mexico on July 9, 1960. Over the next 18 years, the couple had seven children. In 1963, Simmons left the navy, and approximately two years later joined the U.S. Air Force. During his 20-year military career, Simmons was awarded a Bronze Star Medal, the Republic of Vietnam Gallantry Cross for his service as an airman, and the Airforce Ribbon for Excellent Marksmanship. Simmons retired from the air force and military service on November 30, 1979, with the rank of master sergeant.

On April 3, 1981, Simmons was being investigated by the Cloudcroft, New Mexico Department of Human Services for allegations that he had fathered a child with his 17-year-old daughter, Sheila, whom he had been sexually abusing. Fearing arrest, Simmons fled New Mexico in late 1981 with his family, first to Ward, Arkansas, in Lonoke County, and then to Pope County near Dover, Arkansas in the summer of 1983. The family took up residence on a 13-acre tract of land 6.5 miles north of Dover that they would dub "Mockingbird Hill". The residence was constructed of two older-model mobile homes joined to form one large home, neither of which had a telephone nor indoor plumbing, and was surrounded by a makeshift privacy fence which was as high as 10 feet tall in some places. As a result of the home's lack of plumbing, Simmons ordered his family to dig three cesspits, one of which would eventually be where he disposed of some of their bodies.

Simmons worked a string of low-paying jobs in the nearby town of Russellville, Arkansas. He quit a position as an accounts receivable clerk at Woodline Motor Freight after numerous reports of inappropriate sexual advances and went to work at a Sinclair Mini Mart for approximately a year and a half before quitting on December 18, 1987. By the time of the killings, the number of people within the home reduced to seven, as two of the older children (Billy and Sheila) moved out, married, and had children of their own.

Murder spree

Dover 
Shortly before Christmas 1987, Simmons decided to kill all the members of his family. On the morning of December 22, he first killed his wife Rebecca and eldest son Gene by bludgeoning them with a hammer and shooting them with a .22-caliber pistol. He then killed his three-year-old granddaughter Barbara by strangulation. Simmons dumped the bodies in one of the cesspits he had forced his children to dig previously. Simmons then waited for his other children to return from school for Christmas break. Upon their arrival, he told them he had presents for them, but wanted to give them one at a time. He first killed his daughter, 17-year-old Loretta, whom Simmons strangled and held under the water in a rain barrel. The three other children, Eddy, Marianne, and Becky, were then killed in the same way, and subsequently dumped in the cesspit.

Around mid-day on December 26, the remaining members of the family arrived at the home, as Simmons had invited them over for the holidays. The first to be killed was Simmons' son Billy and his wife Renata, who were both shot dead. He then strangled and drowned their 20-month-old son, Trae. Simmons also shot and killed his oldest daughter, Sheila (whom he had sexually abused), and her husband, Dennis McNulty. Simmons then strangled his child by Sheila, seven-year-old Sylvia Gail, and finally his 21-month-old grandson Michael. Simmons laid the bodies of his whole family in neat rows in the lounge. Their bodies were covered with coats except that of Sheila, who was covered by Rebecca Simmons' best tablecloth. The bodies of Trae and Michael were wrapped in plastic sheeting and left in abandoned cars at the end of the lane. After the murders, Simmons drove to a Sears store in Russellville where he retrieved Christmas gifts that he had previously ordered for his family. That night, he went for a drink at a local bar before returning to the home where he spent the rest of the evening and the following day drinking beer and watching television.

Russellville 
On the morning of December 28, Simmons drove to a Walmart in Russellville where he purchased another firearm to use in the attack he was about to carry out. His first target was a law firm where he had previously met secretary Kathy Cribbins Kendrick. Simmons had been infatuated with Kendrick, but she had rejected him. After walking into the office, he shot and killed Kendrick. He next went to an oil company office, where he intended to kill the owner, Russell "Rusty" Taylor. Taylor was also the owner of the Sinclair Mini Mart from which Simmons had recently resigned. He shot and wounded Taylor before killing another person in the building named James David Chaffin; Chaffin was the only deceased victim who was a complete stranger to Simmons. Another employee in the building was shot at, though the bullet missed.

Simmons then drove on to Sinclair Mini Mart, shooting and wounding two more people. His final target was the office of the Woodline Motor Freight Company, where he shot his former supervisor twice, wounding her. He then ordered one of the employees at gunpoint to call the police. When they arrived, Simmons handed over his gun and surrendered without any resistance. Over the course of the 40-minute-long rampage, Simmons had killed two and injured four others.

Victims

Conviction 
After his arrest, Simmons underwent a psychiatric evaluation where he was found fit to stand trial. He first went on trial for the murders of Kendrick and Chaffin, and was found guilty on May 12, 1988, being sentenced to death. He made an additional statement, under oath, supporting his sentence:

I, Ronald Gene Simmons, Sr., want it to be known that it is my wish and my desire that absolutely no action by anybody be taken to appeal or in any way change this sentence. It is further respectfully requested that this sentence be carried out expeditiously.

He next went on trial for the murders of his 14 family members, and was found guilty on February 10, 1989, again being sentenced to death by lethal injection. As to motive, a family friend told investigators that Simmons' wife had been saving up money to divorce Simmons when the killings happened. Also, during the trial, Simmons had to be removed from the courtroom after the prosecutor, John Bynum, was punched by Simmons, and Simmons tried to grab a deputy's handgun, when Bynum introduced a letter between Simmons and his daughter, Sheila, where Simmons expressed anger that Sheila had revealed that he was the father of her child, and that he would see her in Hell. He refused to appeal his death sentence, stating, "To those who oppose the death penalty - in my particular case, anything short of death would be cruel and unusual punishment." The trial court conducted a hearing concerning Simmons' competence to waive further proceedings, and concluded that his decision was knowing and intelligent.

Simmons became the subject of the United States Supreme Court Case Whitmore v. Arkansas when another death row inmate, Jonas Whitmore, attempted, unsuccessfully, to force an appeal of Simmons' case.

Execution 
While on death row, Simmons had to be separated from other prisoners as his life was threatened constantly. This was because he refused to appeal his death sentence; the other prisoners believed Simmons was damaging their chances of beating their own death sentences.

On May 31, Arkansas governor (later President) Bill Clinton signed Simmons' execution warrant, and on June 25, 1990, he died by the method he had chosen, lethal injection, in the Cummins Unit. None of his surviving relatives would claim the body, and he was buried in a potter's field in Lincoln County, Arkansas.

See also 
 Capital punishment in Arkansas
 Capital punishment in the United States
 List of people executed in Arkansas
 List of rampage killers (familicides in the United States)

References

Bibliography
Moore, Jim: Rampage - America's Largest Family Mass Murder; The Summit Publishing Group, 1992. 
Marshall, Bryce Zero at the Bone: Story of Gene Simmons Mass Murder; Pocket Star Books, 1991.

External links
 Crime Library Report
 Ronald Gene Simmons from the Office of the Clark County Prosecuting Attorney
 Article at The Encyclopedia of Arkansas History & Culture

1940 births
1987 murders in the United States
1990 deaths
20th-century American criminals
20th-century executions by Arkansas
20th-century executions of American people
American male criminals
American mass murderers
American murderers of children
American people executed for murder
American spree killers
Executed mass murderers
Executed spree killers
Familicides
Massacres in 1987
Massacres in the United States
Murder in Arkansas
People convicted of murder by Arkansas
People executed by Arkansas by lethal injection
People from Chicago
United States Air Force airmen